Gettin' In over My Head is the fourth studio album by American musician Brian Wilson, released June 2004 on Rhino Records. Many of the songs were reworked versions of tracks recorded for the scrapped album Sweet Insanity and the Andy Paley sessions from the 1990s. The album reached #100 in the US during a 1-week chart stay, and #53 in the UK. Critical reaction was mixed.

It features an assortment of celebrity guests such as Paul McCartney, Elton John, Eric Clapton and Carl Wilson (the latter appearing posthumously on "Soul Searchin", a rejected Beach Boys song from the Paley sessions). Peter Blake created the cover art and assigned 2004 Brian Wilson Presents Smile artist Mark London to art-direct the rest of the package.

Background

{{citation span|text=Most tracks from the album are rerecorded versions of songs dating from Wilson's unreleased Sweet Insanity and Andy Paley sessions from the 1990s. "Soul Searchin'" features a posthumous guest appearance by Carl Wilson, sourced from the Paley sessions. Furthermore, with the concurrent live performances of the recently completed Smile album, and the announcement of its impending issue on CD, completely overshadowed ''Gettin' In Over My Heads release, with most attention going to the former. There was a limited edition set of prints created by artist Peter Blake in 2004.|date=August 2016}}

One songwriter who was reached for a collaboration was XTC's Andy Partridge who recalled, "I rang up a lot of people ... and heard quite a few stories that would put off any sane person from getting involved in the Brian Wilson camp ... They said he would call me ... either he changed his mind, or the management changed his mind, or maybe he just forgot".

Reception

At Metacritic, which assigns a normalized rating out of 100 to reviews from critics, Gettin' In Over My Head received an average score of 55 based on 14 reviews, indicating "mixed or average reviews". Writing in The Rolling Stone Album Guide, reviewer Jackie Wilson wrote, "Wilson is still frighteningly detached from the moment. ... it's best to think of this one as a celebrity's children's record." Critic Robert Christgau said that the album's only improvement on Imagination was the absence of producer Joe Thomas.

John Bush of AllMusic highlighted "Soul Searchin" and the title track in what was otherwise a collection of "weak songs" with "trite lyrics". He wrote, "Whether it's a solo composition or one written with a talented collaborator like Andy Paley, Wilson's songs are uniformly embarrassing". The Guardians Alexis Petridis was disappointed with the record's "musical conservatism" – which be believed came out of Wilson's self-described desperation to be considered in league with Sting, Paul Simon, and Bruce Springsteen – and wrote, "The worst thing about Gettin' In Over My Head - far worse than the mediocre songs and the MOR guest appearances - is that it doesn't sound terribly happy."

Matthew Weiner of Stylus introduced his review by declaring, "It's time to face the facts: we’re never, never, ever getting another great record out of Brian Wilson again. It's over." He added that, given the involvement of the Wondermints and all the other musicians and songwriters Wilson could have potentially collaborated with, "it's impossible to conclude that the utter failure of Getting In Over My Head falls anywhere other than squarely on Wilson himself".

Conversely, Uncuts reviewer said the album was "the most consistent and sympathetically constructed solo album he's made." Billboards review called it "An unexpected but dazzling return to the top form of the later Beach Boys years."

Track listing

Tracks 8–9 and 11–13 were originally recorded for the scrapped Sweet Insanity album
 An iTunes bonus track of "Don't Worry Baby" was released with daughter Wendy Wilson on lead vocals.

Personnel
 Brian Wilson – keyboards, piano, producer, lead vocalsGuests Eric Clapton – lead guitar on "City Blues"
 Elton John – piano, vocals on "How Could We Still Be Dancin"
 Paul McCartney – acoustic guitar and vocals on "A Friend Like You"
 Carl Wilson – vocals on "Soul Searchin'"The Brian Wilson Band Scott Bennett – guitar, bass guitar, percussion, vibraphone and background Vocals
 Jeffrey Foskett – guitar, background vocals
 Probyn Gregory – French horn, guitar, keyboards, trombone, trumpet
 Bob Lizik – bass guitar
 Nick Walusko – guitar
 Paul Mertens – clarinet, flute, harmonica and saxophone
 Darian Sahanaja – keyboards, percussion, piano, vibraphone, background vocalsAdditional musicians'''

 Amy Farris – viola, violin
 Jim Hines – drums, percussion
 Sandra Jensen – violin
 Peter Kent – violin
 Greg Leisz – guitar
 Michael Rhodes – bass guitar
 Andy Paley – percussion and background vocals
 Carol Robbins – harp
 Rudolph Stein – cello
 Todd Sucherman – drums, percussion
 Joe Thomas – keyboards

References

Brian Wilson albums
2004 albums
Rhino Records albums
Albums produced by Brian Wilson
Albums with cover art by Peter Blake (artist)